Aidin Nikkhah Bahrami (February 5, 1982 – December 28, 2007) was an Iranian professional basketball player. He was a member of the Iranian national basketball team along with his brother Samad Nikkhah Bahrami.

Career
He played for Saba Battery BC and helped the team win the Asian Championship. He was also one of the key members of the Iranian national team, winning the Gold Medal at the FIBA Asia Championship 2007.

Death
Having played his last game with Saba Battery against Pardis, Aidin died on December 28, 2007, at 4:00 am IRST on the way to Noshahr in the northern province of Mazandaran, when he lost control of his vehicle. His vehicle then collided with the crash barrier. It was reported that he died on the scene.

It was also reported that there were two other passengers in his vehicle at the time of the collision. One of them (his fiancée) also died, but the other one was discharged from hospital without serious injuries. He was buried on 29 December 2007 at Tehran cemetery (Behesht-e Zahra) in the “celebrity” section (Naam Avaran).

Honours

National team
Asian Championship
: 2007
Asian Games
: 2006

Club

Asian Championship
: 2007 (Saba Battery)
West Asian Championship
: 2007 (Saba Battery)
Iranian Basketball Super League
Champions: 2004, 2006, 2007 (Saba Battery)

References

1982 births
2007 deaths
Asian Games bronze medalists for Iran
Iranian men's basketball players
Road incident deaths in Iran
Asian Games medalists in basketball
Basketball players at the 2006 Asian Games
Small forwards
Medalists at the 2006 Asian Games
Sportspeople from Tehran